Telia may refer to:
 Telium, plural Telia, structure of the reproductive cycle of rusts (plant diseases)
Telia Company, Swedish telecommunications company
Telia Digital-tv, Swedish TV platform
Telia Norge, Norwegian telecommucations company
Telia Eesti, Estonian telecommucations company
Telia, India, village in India
Telia, Nepal, village in Nepal
Telia Challenge Waxholm, golf tournament
Telia 5G -areena, football stadium in Helsinki, Finland.